Frederick Falkiner Goold (May 1808- 1877) was a 19th century Anglican priest in Ireland.

Goold was born in County Limerick on 6 November 1808. He was the youngest son of Thomas  Goold, First Serjeant-at-law (Ireland) and  Master in the Court of Chancery (Ireland) and Elizabeth Nixon. He was educated at Trinity College, Dublin, He was appointed Archdeacon of Raphoe on 13 December 1852; and Private Chaplain to the Lord Lieutenant of Ireland in 1858. He died at Bath, Somerset on 29 January 1877.

He married Caroline Newcomen, one of the many natural children of Thomas Gleadowe-Newcomen, 2nd Viscount  Newcomen, and had six children. His son was an MP; and his son-in-law a bishop.

Arms

References
Cotton. Fasti ecclesiae Hibernicae, Supplement 1878. Page 111. Internet Archive:  .
Edward Walford. "Goold, the Ven. Frederick Falkiner". The County Families of the United Kingdom. Sixth Edition. Robert Hardwicke. Piccadilly, London. 1871. Page 418.
Bernard Burke. "Goold, The Very Rev. Frederick Falkener". A Genealogical and Heraldic Dictionary of the Landed Gentry of Great Britain and Ireland. Harrison. Pall Mall, London. 1858. Volume 1. Page 459.
"Archdeacon Goold" in "Obituary of Eminent Persons", The Illustrated London News, 10 February 1877, p 142, col 3
The Irish Church Advocate. 1 March 1877. Pages 54 and 67. Google Books
"Limerick". Encyclopædia Britannica. Ninth Edition. Volume 14. Page 648 at page 649.
K Theodore Hoppen. Elections, Politics and Society in Ireland: 1832-1885. Clarendon Press, Oxford. 1984. . Page 136. Google Books.
James Maher, "On Some Statements of Archdeacon Goold", 5 November 1866, in Patrick Francis Moran (ed). The Letters of Rev. James Maher, D.D., Late P.P. of Carlow-Graigue, on Religious Subjects, with a Memoir. Browne & Nolan. Nassau Street, Dublin. 1877. Letter 46. Pages 442 to 449.
"The Representation of the University", The Christian Examiner, 3 January 1865, p 9, col 1 at col 2.

Archdeacons of Raphoe
1877 deaths
Alumni of University College, Oxford
Church of Ireland priests
1808 births
Clergy from County Limerick
19th-century Irish Anglican priests